A. M. Raja may refer to:

A. M. Rajah (1929–1989), Indian playback singer
A. M. Raja (politician) (born 1928), Indian politician

See also
Raja (disambiguation)